The Monster of Lake Tota is a legendary aquatic animal known in many works . The monster is an inhabitant of Lake Tota in present-day Colombia, according to the Muisca, who inhabited the Altiplano Cundiboyacense. The earliest reference in modern history was made by the conquistador Gonzalo Jiménez de Quesada. He described the monster as "A fish with a black head like an ox and larger than a whale" (Lucas Fernández de Piedrahita, 1676) and Antonio de Alcedo, 1788)). The monster was also defined as "a monstrous fish", "a black monster", and even as "the Dragon" and as a "divine animal archetype" (2012).

Description 
The description of the monster of Lake Tota is limited to historical references and what is known within the study of Muisca mythology. A report of an alleged sighting took place in 1652. The legend of the monster of Lake Tota also analyzed using cryptozoology, a pseudoscience with ties to cases such as the Loch Ness monster (Nessie) in Scotland, the monster of Lake Nahuel Huapi (Nahuelito) in Argentina, or "The Hide" of the Mapuche mythology in Argentina and Chile (a serpent monster made of various animal hides).

Historical references

17th century

Lucas Fernández de Piedrahita 
In 1676 (August 12), the Colombian priest and historian Lucas Fernández de Piedrahita (Bogotá, 1624 - Panama, 1688), as requested by the Bishop of Santa Marta, presented his General History of the Conquest of the New Kingdom of Granada: the SCRM d. King Charles II of Spain and the Indies, in which Chapter I, paragraph 13, contains the following statements of a monstrous being on Lake Tota:

Manuel Ancízar 

In 1852, Colombian writer, politician, teacher and journalist Manuel Ancízar (Fontibon, December 25, 1812 - Bogota, May 21, 1882); within the works led by Agustin Codazzi, carried out the Corográfica Commission and recorded in his book The Pilgrimage Alpha for the northern provinces of New Granada in 1850-1851 (Alpha was the pseudonym of Ancízar), a reference to the diabloballena monster of Lake Tota that cited Piedrahita's General History of the Conquest of the New Kingdom of Granada: the SCRM d.King Charles II of Spain and the Indians, in Chapter XXIV, paragraph 5:

In the end, Ancízar declared, without discrediting the monster referred to by Piedrahita or exposing any evidence, his doubts about the accuracy of the monster and began to raise his initiative to practice draining Lake Tota to increase the agricultural frontier. He ends the paragraph in reference by stating:

José Jerónimo Triana 

Meanwhile, Colombian botanist, explorer and physician José Jerónimo Triana (Bogota, May 22, 1828 - Paris, October 31, 1890), a member of the Corográfica Commission of Ancízar, also references the issue. A summary of the book Myths, legends, traditions and folklore of Lake Tota (Lilia Montaña de Silva, Edition La Rana y El Águila, UPTC Tunja, 1970, p. 46-47) states:

Additional notes on this part:

A concrete reference to the "black monster" of Lake Tota:

Muisca ancestral conception 

When discussing the issue of the monster of Lake Tota in regards to Muisca ancestry, it must be placed in the context of their respective culture. This culture was independent, as advanced as the better known Inca and Maya civilizations and very different from the colonial thought that arrived with the Spanish colonization of the Americas in the 15th century.

From the Muisca language 
Mariana Escribano, a doctorate in Literature, History and Semiotics from the Paris-Sorbonne University and a scientific linguist and expert in the Muisca language - said:

The monster of Lake Tota could be an archetypal divine animal that was associated as a dragon.

The mythical origin of Lake Tota 
Stories of the mythical origin of Lake Tota mention that “Monetá", the wise old indigenous priest, was preparing the "already extensive and powerful Muisca Confederation" to "exorcise the cruel and evil spirit, Busiraco" in the ancient cavity that now forms Lake Tota. Here's mention of the monstrous animal that lived there:

The ceremony spell against Busiraco aimed at resolving the suffering of summer and water shortages, led to the creation of Lake Tota; the monster is also mentioned as a snake, when he was fatally attacked:

The "black snake" and the creation of the lake:

See also 
 Nahuelito
 Brosno dragon
 Lake Tota

References

External links 
  Monstruo del Lago de Tota - the ONG Fundación Montecito as a representative of the area (Lake Tota and its basin) - accessed 02-05-2016
 Related interviews on W Radio, Colombia, W Fin de Semana programme, date 28 October 2012:
 To:  Adrian Shine, Scotland, about Nessie or the Loch Ness Monster
 To:  Felipe Andrés Velasco, Colombia, about diablo ballena or the Monster of Lake Tota

Colombian folklore
Indigenous South American legendary creatures
Legendary fish
Muisca mythology and religion
Tota
Spanish-language South American legendary creatures
Water monsters